Fletcher's Cove is a park and recreation area owned and managed by National Park Service, located at 4940 Canal Road, Washington, D.C. 20007, between Chain and Key Bridges, part of Chesapeake and Ohio Canal National Historical Park.

Fletcher's Cove, called by many customers "Fletcher's Boathouse",  has been in this location since the 1850s and is renowned as a fishing and recreational area. The nearby Abner Cloud House is the oldest building on the canal, dating back to 1802. After 145 years of business, the fourth generation of the Fletcher family retired in 2004 and Guest Services Incorporated, a National Park Service concessionaire, assumed responsibility for the operation of the concessions. The area surrounding the boat house was then officially named Fletcher's Cove, though most people still call it Fletcher's Boat House.

Proprietors of Fletcher's Boathouse include Julius Fletcher (1950-1978) 1, and Julius Fletcher's sons, Ray and Joe (1979-2004). Ray and Joe were the fourth generation of Fletcher's to run the boathouse. "Those spring runs are the heart of Fletcher's trade. Fishing starts in mid- to late-March, when hordes of white perch move upriver from deep holes downstream where they wintered. The perch, loaded with roe, seek fast, fresh water at the top of the tidal reach where their eggs hatch best. Next come shad and herring, bright from the sea and heavy with roe. Generations of Marylanders and Virginians have converged on the Potomac around Fletcher's each spring to dip-net herring and shad, extract the roe and salt-cure the flesh, though the practice has declined in the last 25 years. Finally, the river in late April and into May teems with spawning striped bass, locally known as rockfish, which attract another wave of anglers keen to catch a trophy up to 50 pounds", said Joe Fletcher in 20044.

While many fishing enthusiasts come to Fletcher's Cove for the spring run of shad, perch, and rockfish, many other people come to kayak the Potomac River, and bike, hike, and run  the C & O Canal and other trails along the river all year round. Fletcher's Boathouse rents rowboats, canoes, kayaks, bikes, and paddle boards. 

Fletcher's Cove is in The Palisades, Washington, D.C.

References

External links
 Fletcher's Cove Boathouse - official site
 Fletcher's Cove parkrun

Parks in Washington, D.C.
The Palisades (Washington, D.C.)